James Nunu Fainga'anuku Faiva (born 13 June 1994) is a Tongan rugby union player who generally plays as a fly half represents Tonga internationally and currently plays for Italian Top10 Petrarca Padova. He was included in the Tongan squad for the 2019 Rugby World Cup which is held in Japan for the first time and also marks his first World Cup appearance.

Career 
He made his international debut for Tonga against Samoa on 27 July 2019.

References 

1994 births
Living people
Tongan rugby union players
Tonga international rugby union players
Rugby union fly-halves